Hong Yeo-jin (born February 5, 1958) is a South Korean actress. Hong's family immigrated to California, United States in 1977, and she began working as a broadcast announcer and commercial model in Los Angeles in 1978. She joined the Miss Korea pageant in 1979, and represented her country at the Miss World pageant that same year. Hong made her acting debut in 1987, and remains active in Korean film and television. She is a breast cancer survivor.

Filmography

Film

Television series

Variety show

Theater

Awards and nominations

References

External links 
 
 
 
 
 

1958 births
Living people
South Korean television actresses
South Korean film actresses
South Korean stage actresses
Miss Korea delegates
Miss World 1979 delegates